Stanley Peter Dromisky (born 25 June 1931) was a Liberal party member of the House of Commons of Canada from 1993 to 2004. By career, he has been a professor and a director of the Thunder Bay Art Gallery.

Born in Fort William, Ontario, Dromisky first attempted to enter Parliament for the Thunder Bay—Atikokan electoral district during the 1988 federal election but lost to incumbent NDP candidate Iain Angus. He defeated Angus in the riding in the 1993 election and was re-elected in 1997 and 2000. Dromisky served in the 35th, 36th, and 37th Canadian Parliaments.

He retired from politics in 2004.

Education
 Teaching Certificate: Canadore College
 Bachelor of Arts: University of Western Ontario
 Bachelor of Education (BEd): University of Toronto
 Master of Education (MEd): University of Wisconsin–Superior
 Doctor of Philosophy (PhD): University of Florida

Electoral record

|}

|}

|}

|}

References

External links
 

1931 births
Living people
Liberal Party of Canada MPs
Members of the House of Commons of Canada from Ontario
Politicians from Thunder Bay
University of Florida alumni
University of Toronto alumni
University of Wisconsin–Superior alumni
University of Western Ontario alumni
21st-century Canadian politicians
Canadore College alumni